Hask or HASK may refer to:

 HAŠK, Hrvatski akademski športski klub, Croatian football club 
 Hask (periodical), official publication of the Armenian Catholicosate of the Great House of Cilicia (Holy See of Cilicia)
 Hask Armenological Review, an academic publication in Armenian studies
 Hayastani Azgayin Scautakan Sharjum Kazmakerputiun, the Armenian Scout movement
 Hask, the (disputed) mathematical category of Haskell (programming language) types and extensionally identified Haskell functions as morphisms